Greater Mackellar Island, also Great Mackellar Islet, is the largest of the Mackellar Islands, lying  north of Cape Denison in the center of Commonwealth Bay, Antarctica. It was discovered and named by the Australasian Antarctic Expedition (1911–14) under Douglas Mawson. The Island is about 1100 m long, and up to 500 m wide.

Important Bird Area
The island forms part of the Mackellar Islands Important Bird Area (IBA), identified as such by BirdLife International because it supports large breeding colonies of Adélie penguins.

See also 
 List of Antarctic and Subantarctic islands

References

External links 
 Sketch map 
 

Important Bird Areas of Antarctica
Penguin colonies
Islands of George V Land